Esfandabad (also Romanized as Esfandābād; also known as Esbenbād, Esbenbād, and Isfandābād) is a village in Esfandar Rural District of Bahman District of Abarkuh County, Yazd province, Iran. At the 2006 National Census, its population was 1,385 in 405 households. The following census in 2011 counted 1,442 people in 441 households. The latest census in 2016 showed a population of 1,449 people in 482 households; it was the largest village in its rural district.

References 

Abarkuh County

Populated places in Yazd Province

Populated places in Abarkuh County